Engin Öztürk (born 28 September 1986) is a Turkish actor.

Early life 
Öztürk was born on 28 September 1986 in Eskişehir. He has 3 older sisters and his paternal family immigrated from Bulgaria. His maternal family is originally from Thessaloniki in Greece. Öztürk played volleyball for 8 years, after graduating from Eskişehir Fatih Anatolian High School.

His father was in the Turkish army. He chose his father's profession and entered the Izmir Air Astsubay Vocational High School. He graduated in 2005. But he gave up being a soldier. Then he graduated theatre department of Hacettepe University.

Career 
He left the TSK (Turkish Armed Forces) in 2006 due to his incompatibility with military service and came to Ankara and completed his education in Hacettepe University State Conservatory the department of theater in 2012. He was a bartender in the bar of actor, Erdal Beşikçioğlu. In 2010 Öztürk debuted as Selim Yaşaran in the TV series Fatmagül'ün Suçu Ne?. He played in the hit series Behzat Ç. Bir Ankara Polisiyesi. In 2013, he portrayed Selim II in the historical drama Muhteşem Yüzyıl.
He is now a very  famous actor and has gained his popularity. He is now also counted as the  top 7th most handsome Turkish actor.

Filmography

Film

TV series

References

1986 births
Living people
Turkish male television actors
Turkish male film actors
People from Eskişehir
Hacettepe University alumni
21st-century Turkish male actors